Lord Justice Kennedy or Kennedy LJ may refer to:
 Sir Paul Kennedy (English judge) (born 1935), Lord Justice of Appeal from 1992 to 2005
 Sir William Rann Kennedy (1846-1915), Lord Justice of Appeal from 1907 to 1915

See also
Justice Kennedy (disambiguation)